The 1920 Michigan Agricultural Aggies football team was an American football team that represented Michigan Agricultural College (MAC) as an independent during the 1920 college football season. In their first and only year under head coach George Clark, the Aggies compiled a 4–6 record and outscored their opponents 270 to 166.

On October 30, the Aggies set a school scoring record with 109 points against . After a bye week, the team scored 81 points against the Chicago YMCA. The Aggies won the two games by a total of 190 to 0.

In April 1921, coach Clark left Michigan Agricultural to become head football coach at the University of Kansas. He later led the 1935 Detroit Lions team to the NFL Championship.

Schedule

References

Michigan Agricultural
Michigan State Spartans football seasons
Michigan Agricultural Aggies football